Lal Saeed is a former Pakistani professional boxer, physical trainer for the Pakistan Navy and the Pakistan Boxing Federation coach appointed by the federation during his professional boxing career.

In 1971, he represented Pakistan and won Hilali Cup, one of the 1970s biggest cup in Asia. From 1971 to 1976, he represented Pakistan Navy in Inter-services Championship, leading the navy to win Quaid-e-Azam International Boxing Championship. He was also a part of 1970 Asian Games.

Awards
The recipient of a gold medal in 1969 and the Pride of Performance award in 2010, he was also given 'an award of outstanding performance' by the chief of naval staff in 1974.

Biography 
He was born in Nowshera, Khyber Pakhtunkhwa. He started his boxing career around 1969, and was trained by a Pakistani boxing coach Yaqoob Kamrani and an American coach Tom John. He participated in various uncertain national and international tournaments, including Hilali Cup in Sri Lanka.

After the government allegedly undermined sports and sports-personalities in the country, he later left participating in sports and started working as a fruit-vendor in Peshawar.

References 

Living people
Pakistani male boxers
Date of birth missing (living people)
Sportspeople from Peshawar
Recipients of the Pride of Performance
Year of birth missing (living people)